Pa Socheatvong (born 1 July 1957) is a Cambodian politician who was the Governor of Phnom Penh from 2013 to 2017. His appointment was confirmed on 14 April 2013 by King Norodom Sihamoni.

References 

Cambodian People's Party politicians
Living people
1957 births
Members of the National Assembly (Cambodia)
Mayors of places in Cambodia
Governors of Phnom Penh